LuaLua TV (Arabic:قناة اللؤلؤة)  is a Bahraini opposition TV Channel. It started broadcasting in 2011 from London. It was named after the Pearl Roundabout. It is blocked in most Gulf Cooperation Council countries, including Bahrain.

In June 2021, Federal Bureau of Investigation and Bureau of Industry and Security seized LuaLua's domain, alongside several other websites such as Press TV, Al-Alam TV and Al-Masirah TV, citing links to Iran and therefore, violations of US sanctions. The website has since come back under a new domain.

References

External links 

 

Arabic-language television stations
Domain name seizures by United States